Sealed with a Kiss is an album by the Eyeliners, released on 25 September 2001 by Lookout Records.

Track listing
"Sealed with a Kiss" 2:11
"Play It Again" 2:13
"It Could Have Been You" 2:00
"Too Good to Be True" 3:07
"I Could Never Hate You" 2:23
"Bad Luck Charm" 2:05
"Something to Say" 1:40
"When Will I See You Again?" 1:34
"Wishing on a Star" 2:13
"I'd Do It All Over Again" 2:49
"Everything's Alright" 2:37
"Finished with You" 2:12

References

2001 albums
Lookout! Records albums
Albums produced by Ryan Greene